Lists of Knesset members cover members of the Knesset of Israel. They are organized by session, by ethnicity and by position.

By session

 List of members of the first Knesset (1949–51)
 List of members of the second Knesset (1951–55)
 List of members of the third Knesset (1955–59)
 List of members of the fourth Knesset (1959–61)
 List of members of the fifth Knesset (1961–65)
 List of members of the sixth Knesset (1965–69)
 List of members of the seventh Knesset (1969–74)
 List of members of the eighth Knesset (1974–77)
 List of members of the ninth Knesset (1977–81)
 List of members of the tenth Knesset (1981–84)
 List of members of the eleventh Knesset (1984–88)
 List of members of the twelfth Knesset (1988–92)
 List of members of the thirteenth Knesset (1992–96)
 List of members of the fourteenth Knesset (1996–99)
 List of members of the fifteenth Knesset (1999–2003)
 List of members of the sixteenth Knesset (2003–06)
 List of members of the seventeenth Knesset (2006–09)
 List of members of the eighteenth Knesset (2009–2013)
 List of members of the nineteenth Knesset (2013–2015)
 List of members of the twentieth Knesset (2015–2019)
 List of members of the twenty-first Knesset (2019)
 List of members of the twenty-second Knesset (2019–2020)
 List of members of the twenty-third Knesset (2020–2021)
 List of members of the twenty-fourth Knesset (2021-2022)
 List of members of the twenty-fifth Knesset (2022-)

By ethnicity
 List of Arab members of the Knesset

By position
 List of prime ministers of Israel
 List of Knesset speakers

By party
 List of Likud Knesset members